Marjorie Eleanor McIntosh (1907 – 6 May 1964) was a British politician, who served on London County Council.

Born Marjorie Betts, she was the daughter of Frank Betts, and the sister of Barbara Castle.  She was educated at St Hugh's College, Oxford, and joined the Labour Party, winning election to Birmingham City Council. In 1932, she married Alistair John McIntosh, principal of the City of London College and a lecturer in transport studies.

By 1947, McIntosh had moved to London, and that year she was elected to represent Battersea North on the London County Council.  She served on its education committee, spending a period as the committee's chair, while also working as a lecturer in the social sciences at Bedford College.  In 1952, she moved to become an alderman on the council, and in the 1964 Greater London Council election she won a seat in Hammersmith.  She was involved in planning the creation of the Inner London Education Authority, but was taken ill and died before it or the Greater London Council were formally established.

References

1907 births
1964 deaths
Academics of Bedford College, London
Alumni of St Hugh's College, Oxford
Councillors in Birmingham, West Midlands
Labour Party (UK) councillors
Members of London County Council
Members of the Greater London Council
Women councillors in England